Prospero Bottini (1621 – 21 March 1712) was a Roman Catholic prelate who served as Titular Archbishop of Myra (1675–1712).

Biography
Prospero Bottini was born in Lucan, Italy in 1621.
On 15 July 1675, he was appointed during the papacy of Pope Clement X as Titular Archbishop of Myra.
He served as Titular Archbishop of Myra until his death on 21 March 1712.

Episcopal succession

See also 
Catholic Church in Italy

References

External links and other references
 (for Chronology of Bishops) 
 (for Chronology of Bishops) 

17th-century Italian Roman Catholic archbishops
18th-century Italian Roman Catholic archbishops
Bishops appointed by Pope Clement X
1621 births
1712 deaths